The 146th Infantry Regiment was an infantry regiment of the United States Army, Ohio National Guard. It was formed in 1917 from the old 8th Ohio Infantry Regiment and served in several American wars from 1898 to 1919.

History
The 8th Infantry Regiment of the Ohio National Guard was organized at Massillon from new and existing units on 6 July 1876. It was consolidated with the 9th Infantry Regiment, which was organized on 21 February 1877 at Akron, on 13 August 1878; at the same time the regimental headquarters moved to Wooster. The 10th Infantry Regiment, organized on 6 July 1876 at Youngstown, was consolidated into the 8th on 27 June 1881.

Spanish–American War
On 25 April 1898, the United States declared war on Spain, beginning the Spanish–American War. The 8th Ohio Volunteer Infantry was mustered into service on 13 May 1898 in Columbus, Ohio, and had 48 officers and 838 enlisted men on its roster.  They arrived at Camp Alger, Virginia on 20 May, and trained there until 5 July, when they received orders to deploy to Santiago, Cuba under the command of GEN Nelson A. Miles. The regiment arrived in Siboney, Cuba on 10 July and reinforced the V Army Corps under GEN William Rufus Shafter. 0600 on 11 July, the American lines were ordered to open fire on the Spanish defenses. The barrage was very effective and much damage was done to the defending force. The batteries opened upon the enemy from El Pozo Hill, and the American fleet fired its shells into the city of Santiago.  Every preparation had been made for a combined assault both by land and sea. Spanish General Toral had twice refused to make an unconditional surrender, and GEN Shafter, Commodore Winfield Scott Schley and Commodore William T. Sampson determined to give the Spaniards only one more chance and then destroy the city of Santiago with the batteries from the shore and on the war-ships. As the day progressed, the firing became heavier. From the sea, the bombardment was begun by the USS Newark with its 8-inch guns, and then the USS New York and USS Brooklyn followed. The men of the 8th Ohio could see the men of the Signal Corps on a high ridge wigwagging to direct the shots to the ships. The first heavy volley fired from the American lines almost effectually silenced the Spanish soldiers in the trenches, and hardly a sign of life could be seen there. The Siege of Santiago ended shortly after, on 17 July 1898, and the remained on occupation duty in Cuba until 18 August. They returned to the US on 26 August, and mustered out of service on 21 November 1898. In Cuba, the 8th Ohio lost 4 officers and 68 enlisted men due to Yellow fever.

1900s 
The regiment was disbanded on 14 April 1899 and its elements were reorganized as unattached companies for a brief period until it was reorganized in Bucyrus on 21 July. The regiment was briefly commanded by Charles W. F. Dick, who succeeded to command of a brigade and was succeeded by Edward Vollrath. Vollrath remained in command from 1899 to 1917. For service on the Mexico–United States border, it mustered into Federal service on 19 June 1916 at Camp Willis, and mustered out after its return on 22 March 1917 at Fort Benjamin Harrison, Indiana.

World War I
The National Defense Act of 1916 reorganized the US Military, and in time for World War I, the 8th Ohio was reorganized into the 146th Infantry Regiment, and was assigned to the 37th Infantry Division, the "Buckeye" division, at Camp Sheridan, Alabama in August 1917.  The regiment trained together and expanded its size before arriving in France on 22 June 1918. The 146th was assigned to the 73rd Infantry Brigade alongside the 145th Infantry Regiment and trained under French Army tutelage in the Bourmont sector. On 4 August, the 146th went into the frontline in the Baccarat sector and continued to train under the French VI Corps. On 16 September, it was transported to Robert-Espagne where it remained for 4 days. The Ohioans were then sent to Récicourt, and then to Avocourt where they joined the V Corps' advance during the Meuse-Argonne Offensive. After continuous fighting, the regiment was relieved on 1 October 1918 when they had reached Cierges. After resting behind the lines, the 146th was sent to Hooglede, Belgium in the Lys sector, arriving on the frontline on 22 October.  Attached to the French XXX Corps, the regiment advanced on the Scheldt River until they were relieved on 5 November, and enjoyed some rest at Tielt before moving back into the fray on 8 November. Attached to the French XXXIV Corps, the 146th advanced on, and forced a crossing of the Scheldt River on the night of 10–11 November.  The Ohioans resumed the advance on the morning of 11 November, but were halted at 1100 due to the Armistice of 11 November 1918. When the 146th Infantry Regiment returned home to Ohio in 1919, it was formally deactivated.

The elements formerly part of the 8th Ohio were consolidated with those of the 5th Ohio in the Ohio National Guard to form the 3rd Ohio Infantry between 1919 and 1920, whose headquarters was Federally recognized at Cleveland on 1 July 1920. A year later, it became 145th Infantry of the 37th Division.

References

146
146
United States Army regiments of World War I
Military units and formations established in 1876
Military units and formations disestablished in 1919
1876 establishments in Ohio